Bernhard IV, Lord of Lippe ( in Brake – June 1275) was a ruling Lord of Lippe.

Life 
He was the eldest son of Bernard III and his wife, Sofie of Cuijck-Arnsberg.

In 1254, he took up grovenment of Rheda and in 1265, he succeeded his father as ruler of Lippe.  His brother Herman III inherited the city of Lippstadt.

With his uncle, Bishop Simon I of Paderborn, he fought in the Battle of Zülpich of 1267 against the Duchy of Jülich.  Simon was captured.  In 1269, Bernard IV paid a large ransom to secure Simon's release.  He had to borrow the money, causing the House of Lippe to be burdened by debt.

At different times during his reign, he was regent of Ravensberg, had a dispute with the city of Lippstadt, which had joined the Rhenish League of Cities, and was liege lord of Vehmic court in Wesenfort.

He died in 1275, and was buried in Marienfeld Abbey.

Marriage and issue 
In 1260, Bernard married Agnes ( – ), a daughter of Count Dietrich V of Cleves and Hedwig of Meißen.  Agnes and Bernard had the following children:
 Simon I ( – 10 August 1344), married Countess Adelaide of Waldeck and had issue
 Elisabeth (b. ), married Count Henry III of Solms-Braunfels and had issue

Footnotes 

Lords of Lippe
Lords of Rheda
1230s births
1275 deaths
Year of birth uncertain
13th-century German nobility